Hallsboro is an unincorporated community and census-designated place (CDP) in Columbus County, in southeastern North Carolina, United States. As of the 2010 census it had a population of 465.

Crime rates
Because there are no specific crime rates for the town of Hallsboro, the data was taken from Columbus County.

County population: 58,098
Total crimes: 3,076
Murder: 8
Rape: 11
Robbery: 58
Aggravated assault: 205
Burglary: 991
Theft: 1,603
Motor vehicle thefts: 190
Coverage indicator 98%

Education
Hallsboro has an elementary school and middle school. For high school, students must travel to East Columbus Jr./Sr High School at Lake Waccamaw, about 5 miles to the east.

Geography
Hallsboro is located in east-central Columbus County at  (34.322391, -78.598902). The town is in the Eastern Time Zone (EST/EDT) and observes daylight saving time.

Surrounding communities include Lake Waccamaw  to the east, Whiteville, the Columbus County seat,  to the west, Bolton  to the east, and Clarkton  to the north.

Demographics

Local parks and attractions

Notable person
Ann Atwater, born in Hallsboro, became a civil rights activist in Durham, North Carolina, working especially with Operation Breakthrough

References

Unincorporated communities in Columbus County, North Carolina
Unincorporated communities in North Carolina
Census-designated places in Columbus County, North Carolina
Census-designated places in North Carolina